Microtus kermanensis, the Kerman vole, is a species of vole.

References 

Microtus